Ang Lee is a Taiwanese filmmaker. He is most known for his films, Eat Drink Man Woman (1994), Sense and Sensibility (1995), The Ice Storm (1997), Crouching Tiger, Hidden Dragon (2000), Hulk (2003), Brokeback Mountain (2005), Lust, Caution (2007), and Life of Pi (2012).

Three of Lee's films have been nominated for the Academy Award for Best Foreign Language Film with Crouching Tiger, Hidden Dragon (2000) winning.The other two nominations were The Wedding banquet (1993),  Eat Drink Man Woman (1994). His films Sense and Sensibility (1995), Crouching Tiger, Hidden Dragon (2000), Brokeback Mountain (2005), Life of Pi (2012) were nominated for the Academy Award for Best Picture. He has also received ten British Academy Film Award nominations winning four awards for Sense and Sensibility, Crouching Tiger, Hidden Dragon, and Brokeback Mountain. In 2020 he received the BAFTA Fellowship for Outstanding Contributions to British Cinema. He has also received 11 Golden Globe Award nominations, 8 Independent Spirit Award nominations, and 8 Critics' Choice Movie Awards nominations. He has been honored by the Directors Guild of America and the Producers Guild of America. His films have also premiered and competed at the Cannes Film Festival, Venice Film Festival, and Berlin Film Festival.

Lee has received various honors including the Knight of the French Ordre des Arts et des Lettres in 2012 from the French Government. In 2021, he became a Knight of the French highest honour Legion of Honor.

Major associations

Academy Awards

British Academy Film Awards

Golden Globe Awards

Independent Spirit Awards

Critics' Choice Award

Festival awards

Cannes Film Festival

Berlin International Film Festival

Venice Film Festival

Guild awards

Producers Guild of America Award

Directors Guild of America Award

Miscellaneous awards

Critics awards

Government orders and decorations 
 Knight of the French Ordre des Arts et des Lettres (2012).
 Knight of the French highest honour Legion of Honor (2021)

References 

Lee, Ang